Basketball was one of the 14 sports disciplines held in the 1958 Asian Games in Tokyo, Japan. The Philippines successfully defended their title and won their third straight Asian Games championship. The games were held from May 25 to June 1, 1958.

Medalists

Results

Preliminary round

Group A

Group B

Group C

Classification 7th–10th

Final round

Final standing

References
 Results

 
Basketball
1951
1958 in Asian basketball
International basketball competitions hosted by Japan